Russ Mosley (July 22, 1918 – August 2, 1997) was a player in the National Football League. He played two seasons with the Green Bay Packers.

References 

1918 births
1997 deaths
People from Stoddard County, Missouri
Green Bay Packers players
Alabama Crimson Tide football players
American football halfbacks